Admiral Fellowes may refer to:

Charles Fellowes (1823–1886), British Royal Navy vice admiral
Thomas Fellowes (Royal Navy officer, born 1778) (1778–1853), British Royal Navy rear admiral
Thomas Fellowes (Royal Navy officer, born 1827) (1827–1923), British Royal Navy rear admiral